Zohar Zasno (born 21 November 2001) is an Israeli professional football player who plays as a right-back for Israeli Premier League club F.C. Ashdod and the Israel national under-21 team.

Early life
Zasno was born in Ashdod, Israel, to an Ethiopian Jewish family.

References

External links

2001 births
Living people
Israeli footballers
Footballers from Ashdod
F.C. Ashdod players
Israeli Premier League players
Israeli people of Ethiopian-Jewish descent
Association football defenders